Barry McGee (born 1966) is an American contemporary artist. He is a well known graffiti artist, and a pioneer of the Mission School art movement. McGee is known by his monikers: Twist, Ray Fong, Bernon Vernon, and P.Kin.

Life and education
Barry McGee was born in 1966 in San Francisco, California. He is of Chinese and Irish descent. His father worked at an auto body repair shop. McGee graduated from El Camino High School in South San Francisco, California.

He attended the San Francisco Art Institute, where he graduated in 1991 with a concentration in painting and printmaking. 

McGee was married to the artist Margaret Kilgallen in 1999, who later died of breast cancer in 2001. They have a daughter named Asha. After Kilgallen's death, McGee married artist Clare Rojas in 2005.

Work 
"Acclaimed for his work in the street as a graffiti artist and for his painted installations in galleries, museums and art festivals around the world, Barry McGee crafts a visual language that makes itself understood. It is public, addressing social concerns of urban life, and very private, elaborating a unique personal style that focuses on humanity, one painstakingly detailed, fine brush-painted image at a time."

Career
Barry McGee has exhibited, both solo and group, in galleries internationally.

McGee was a central figure in the graffiti art scene in San Francisco from the late 1980s and into the 1990s. As Twist, he became well known nationally by his stylized black and white pictographic flathead screw graffiti 'throw ups'.  Later he was part of the Mission School art movement based in the aesthetics of the Mission District of San Francisco. His work is founded on a pessimistic view of the urban experience, which he describes as, "urban ills, over-stimulations, frustrations, addictions & trying to maintain a level head under the constant bombardment of advertising". He was also an artist in residence at inner-city McClymonds High School in Oakland, California, in the early '90s.  Although his artistic origins lie in New York subway graffiti he has been included as a member of the street art movement.
 
McGee's installations consist of simple bold paintings which are influenced by Islamic patterns on tiles, vernacular sign painting, or use caricatures of the destitute.  These paintings are clustered together in combination with photographs of other graffiti writers.  Older work included layering of shapes, and buff marks, backgrounds of drips painted directly on the gallery wall. He has painted stylized portraits on empty bottles of liquor, flattened spray cans, and wrecked vehicles for art shows. He has collaborated frequently with Amaze, allowing him to paint the exterior and interior of the galleries exhibiting McGee's work. They have also utilized realistic moving mechanical human figures that appear to be tagging gallery walls.

The market value of his work rose considerably after 2001 as a result of his being included in the Venice Biennale and other major exhibitions. As a result, much of his San Francisco street art has been scavenged or stolen.

Controversies 
In September 1999, a 64-foot-long, 8-foot-high mural made up of 300 pieces, made by Barry McGee and financially sponsored by the Luggage Store Gallery and the Creative Work Fund, was stolen off a vacant commercial building in the South of Market neighborhood of San Francisco. It was never recovered.

In 2004, as part of an exhibit at San Francisco's City Hall, McGee spray-painted "Smash the State" on the walls of Supervisor Matt Gonzalez's office. SFGate wrote: "The timing and placement of the artwork are interesting, seeing how City Hall is a registered historical landmark, and you need approval just to hang a bulletin board". Gonzalez told the press that he knew his office would be repainted for the next occupant.

McGee was involved in a controversy regarding the Adidas Y1 HUF, a shoe for which he provided the artwork. This gave rise to a protest campaign by some Asian-Americans who claimed that the picture on the shoe's tongue depicts a racist stereotype. McGee responded to the controversy in a March 2006 press release. He stated that the drawing was a portrait of himself as an 8-year-old child.

Selected exhibitions

1999: The Buddy System, Deitch Gallery in New York City, NYC
1999: HOSS, Rice Gallery in Houston, TX
2001: with Todd James, and Stephen Powers, Venice Biennale
2004: Barry McGee and Josh Lazcano, Gallery Paule Anglim in San Francisco, CA
2004: Rose Art Museum
2006: Featured in Beautiful Losers exhibition at Circleculture Gallery in Berlin, Germany
2006–2007: LOFT installation at Roberts & Tilton Gallery in Los Angeles, CA
2007: Watari Museum of Contemporary Art
2008: Baltic Centre for Contemporary Art
2008: The Big Sad (With Clare Rojas), Riverside Art Museum
2008: Life on Mars Carnegie International
2008: Ratio 3 in San Francisco, CA
2009: McGee / Templeton / Pettibon exhibition curated by Aaron Rose at Circleculture Gallery in Berlin, Germany
2009–2010: Biennale de Lyon, France
2010: The Last Night (With HuskMitNavn), A.L.I.C.E. gallery in Brussels, Belgium
2012: Retrospective at the Berkeley Art Museum
2019: The Other Side, solo show, Perrotin Gallery, Hong Kong
 2021 : Fuzz Gathering, solo show, Galerie Perrotin, Paris

See also
Beautiful Losers (film)
Mission School
Lowbrow (art movement)
Piece by Piece (documentary)

Bibliography 

McGee, Barry, Ellen Robinson, and Katya Tylevich. Barry McGee. Bologna: Damiani, (2018). 
Boas, Natasha. Energy that is all around: Mission School: Chris Johanson, Margaret Kilgallen, Alicia McCarthy, Barry McGee, Ruby Neri. San Francisco: San Francisco Art Institute Chronicle Books, (2014). 
Rinder, Lawrence, and Barry McGee. Barry McGee. Berkeley & New York: University of California, Berkeley Art Museum and Pacific Film Archive D.A.P./Distributed Art Publishers, Inc, (2012). 
Rose, Aaron (editor), Barry McGee . Tokyo: Damiani, (2010). 
Kilgallen, Margaret, et al. Margaret kilgallen : in the sweet bye & bye. Los Angeles: California Institute of the Arts/REDCAT, (2006). 
Bertelli, Patrizio, Barry McGee. Fondazione Prada, (2002). 
Kawachi, Taka, Street Market: Barry McGee, Stephen Powers, Todd James. Little More, (2000).

References

Bibliography
 Barry McGee. 2002. Barry McGee: The Buddy System. 
 Barry McGee, Germano Celant, Prada. 2003. Barry McGee. 
 Aaron Rose and Christian Strike (editors). 2004. Beautiful Losers: Contemporary Art and Street Culture.

External links
Barry McGee at Ratio 3, San Francisco, CA

1966 births
Living people
Artists from San Francisco
American graffiti artists
American people of Chinese descent
American people of Irish descent
San Francisco Art Institute alumni
Mission District, San Francisco
People from South San Francisco, California
Painters from California